Puthuppally is one of the few major centers and towns in the Kottayam district of Kerala, India as many areas can be reached only via Puthuppally. It is famous for the ancient Oriental Orthodox Church named 'Puthuppally Palli'. The town is growing further owing to the increasing number of major roads connecting it to other major towns in the region.

The town hosts the campus of Rubber Board, the biggest central government organization in the district.  The town is also home to the Institute of Human Resources Development campus as well as MG University paramedical campuses.

Demographics 
As of the 2011 Census, Puthuppally has a population of 29,635 of which 14,304 are males and 15,331 are females. Average sex ratio is 1072 compared to the state average of 1084. The number of children under the age of 6 is 2,291 which accounts for 7.73% of total population of the town. Child sex ratio is around 914 compared to state average of 964. Literacy rate of Puthuppally city is 98.02% which is higher than state average of 94.00%.

Governance
Puthuppally assembly constituency is part of Kottayam (Lok Sabha constituency). The former Chief Minister of Kerala Oommen Chandy, is representing the Puthuppally Legislative Constituency since 1970.

History 
The Puthuppally Firing (Puthuppally Vediveyppu) during the Indian Freedom Struggle is one of the important historical events related to this place. One person got martyred in the Firing. In a late afternoon a youth named Maveli Kochu was on his way to the native ball playground unaware of the happenings. A stray bullet hit him in his navel, and he died on the spot.

Transport 
Kottayam railway station serves the town. The nearest railway station is Chingavanam railway station. Kottayam-Pathanamthitta road intersects with Thiruvalla-Ettumanoor and Thiruvalla-Kidangoor-Muvattupuzha bypass making Puthuppally one of most congested junctions in district.

Culture 
 The feast at St. George Orthodox Church, Puthuppally is a regional festival which is celebrated by many irrespective of religion, caste, or creed.
Shadkala Govinda Marar, a musician, lived near Vennimala, which was a cultural centre during the rule of Venad Kings.
 Puthuppally Hindu Mahasammelan (Started in 1996) is a Hindu convention with a structure similar to the Cherukolpuzha Hindumatha Parishad. It is conducted annually during the summer vacation.
 Puthuppally Ecumenical Fellowship celebrates Christmas every year at the Govt. Boys High School/Higher Secondary Ground, from 1982 onwards.

Notable people 
 Oommen Chandy – Ex-Chief Minister of Kerala, India
 Vettom Mani – Scholar / Author on Indian Puranas
 E. C. George Sudarshan – Scientist (Quantum Optics)
 Kannukuzhiyil Kochuthommen Apothecary - author of Parishkarappathi, founder of St Paul's Marthoma church, Puthuppally, co-founder of Mar Thoma Seminary Higher Secondary School, Kottayam.

Sports
Puthuppally is known for the sport called native ball play which is organized annually. A ball which is made of leather is used. It is generally referred to as naadan panthu kali or tukal panthu Kali. Kerala Native Ball Association's office is located in Puthuppally. This traditional game is facing a slow death as the younger generations do not find it appealing. Usually, the game is played on level grounds and non-availability of playgrounds also contributes to the slow death of the sport. The playground opposite to the Government Boys School on the 'High School Road' is one of the biggest grounds in Puthuppally. Games including Cricket, Football, Native ball play, etc. are played here.

References

External links

 Official Puthuppally Pally Website
 Population as per 2001 Census
 Kairaly Nursery School
 IPC Kottayam Theological Seminary Website
 Adhyapaka Urban Co-Operative Bank Website

Suburbs of Kottayam